Ernst Böhm (6 March 1890 – 2 September 1963) was a German painter. His work was part of the art competitions at the 1928 Summer Olympics, the 1932 Summer Olympics, and the 1936 Summer Olympics.

References

1890 births
1963 deaths
20th-century German painters
20th-century German male artists
German male painters
Olympic competitors in art competitions
People from Berlin